North Tyneside is a constituency represented in the House of Commons of the UK Parliament since 2010 by Mary Glindon of the Labour Party.

History
This seat was represented from its creation in 1997 by Stephen Byers of the Labour Party, who before that election represented the abolished seat of Wallsend from 1992. Byers stood down at the 2010 general election and his party selected local councillor Mary Glindon as their new candidate for the general election, which she won with a majority of 12,884.

Constituency profile
This constituency forms north-east suburbs to the largest city in the region, Newcastle.  At the end of 2010, unemployment still reflected a slightly less strong economy than in the city's shipbuilding heyday and stood in this seat alone at 5.7% by claimant count, compared to a regional average of 5.5%, significantly lower than South Shields' 7.7%.  As to the male only claimant total, this amounted to 7.8%, just part of a significant region-wide disparity but significantly lower than Middlesbrough's 12.8%, however both sets of figures were a little higher than the national average — Greater London saw an average of 4.1% and for men a proportion of 4.9%.

Boundaries

1997–2010: The Borough of North Tyneside wards of Battle Hill, Benton, Camperdown, Holystone, Howdon, Longbenton, Riverside, Valley, and Weetslade.

Apart from Riverside ward, which was transferred from Tynemouth, the constituency was formed from the majority of the abolished Wallsend constituency.

2010–present: The Borough of North Tyneside wards of Battle Hill, Benton, Camperdown, Howdon, Killingworth, Longbenton, Northumberland, Riverside, Wallsend, and Weetslade.

The Wallsend and Northumberland wards moved from Newcastle upon Tyne East and Wallsend which was abolished and replaced by the re-established constituency of Newcastle upon Tyne East. Valley ward was transferred to Tynemouth.

Members of Parliament

Elections

Elections in the 2010s

2010: At this election Mary Glindon was Councillor for Battle Hill Ward, David Ord was Councillor for Northumberland Ward and Gagan Mohindra was District Councillor in Epping Forest, Essex.

Elections in the 2000s
2005: Duncan McLellan was Councillor for Weetslade Ward 2005-2012.

Elections in the 1990s
1997: Michael McIntyre was Councillor for Whitley Bay Ward 1992-2012.

See also
List of parliamentary constituencies in Tyne and Wear
History of parliamentary constituencies and boundaries in Tyne and Wear

Notes

References

Parliamentary constituencies in Tyne and Wear
Constituencies of the Parliament of the United Kingdom established in 1997
Metropolitan Borough of North Tyneside